This is a list of fellows of the Royal Society elected in its 19th year, 1678.

Fellows 
John Mayow  (1640–1679)
David Hannisius  (d. 1681)
Joseph Moxon  (1627–1691)
Walter Chetwynd  (1633–1693)
Theodor Kerckring  (1640–1693)
William Perry  (1650–1696)
Sir James Langham  (1620–1699)
Edmund Dickenson  (1624–1707)
Dethlevus Cluverus  (1645–1708)
Francis Aston  (1644–1715)
John Van de Bemde  (1655–1726)
Joseph Lane  (d. 1728)
Edmond Halley  (1656–1742)

References

1678
1678 in science
1678 in England